Mississippi Highway 488 (MS 488) is a state highway in rural central Mississippi.

Route description
MS 488 begins at an intersection with MS 35 south of Carthage, Leake County and the Pearl River. The highway heads east through a mix of open fields and woods though  into the trip, the road reaches a small settlement named Freeny where some houses and churches surround the main intersection. It crosses Standing Pine Creek and curves to the southeast at Galillee Road. It then travels through the community of Free Trade where several churches are located in the area. MS 488 also intersects the unsigned MS 502 at Callahan Road. The road eventually curves more to the east where in a clearing, MS 488 reaches the western terminus of the unsigned MS 484 at Risher Road and Gunter Road. MS 488 enters the community of Madden where at an intersection with Dr. Brantley Road, the state highway turns to the north briefly.  later, MS 488 reaches Thaggard Road, the eastern end of MS 502, and curves to the northeast, in front of Leake Academy. It heads through wooded lands and crosses into Neshoba County before turning to the north. At Laurel Hill, MS 488 turns to the east at an intersection where MS 484 has its eastern terminus and MS 427 has its southern terminus. Continuing east through fields and woods, the highway passes through the communities of Waldo and Hope before entering the formal limits of the census-designated place of Pearl River, part of the Choctaw reservation.

History
MS 488 was formally designated in 1953, though the portion of the road from Madden towards Philadelphia had been part of the state highway system since 1951. Since then, the highway's alignment had generally remained unchanged with only paving of the full length of the road occurring since then.

Major intersections

References

External links

488
Transportation in Leake County, Mississippi
Transportation in Neshoba County, Mississippi